Events in the year 1855 in Norway.

Incumbents
Monarch: Oscar I

Events
 25 June – Marcus Thrane and 132 other members of the Labour Union was sentenced for crimes against the state security.
 31 December – Population Census: 1,490,047 inhabitants in Norway.

Arts and literature

Notable births
23 January – Edvard Hagerup Bull, judge and politician (died 1938)
31 January – Karl Uchermann, painter and illustrator (died 1940).
11 February – Erik Werenskiold, painter and illustrator (died 1938)
21 March – Fredrik Georg Gade, physician (died 1933)
10 April – Jacob Fjelde, Norwegian-American sculptor (died 1896)
28 May – Ole Amundsen Buslett, Norwegian-American author, newspaperman, and politician (died 1924)
24 July – Nils Claus Ihlen, engineer, politician and Minister (died 1925)
5 November – Einar Wang, politician (died 1939)

Full date unknown
Lars Kristian Abrahamsen, politician and Minister (died 1921)
Anders Bergene, businessperson (died 1920)
Hartvig Sverdrup Eckhoff, architect (died 1928)
Nils Hansteen, painter (died 1912)
Gjert Holsen, politician (died 1921)
Ambrotius Olsen Lindvig, politician and Minister (died 1946)
Anthon B. Nilsen, businessman, politician and author (died 1936)
Axel Paulsen, speed skater and figure skater (died 1938)
Ivar Bergersen Sælen, politician and Minister (died 1923)
Karl Anton Sanderød, politician (died 1924)

Notable deaths
26 July - Ole Paus,  ship's captain, shipowner and land owner (born 1766)
15 December – Fredrik Meltzer, businessman and politician (born 1779).

Full date unknown
Olea Crøger, folk music collector (born 1801)
Christian Holm, politician (born 1783)

See also

References